Wroxall is a village and civil parish in the central south of the Isle of Wight.

It is close to Appuldurcombe House.

The parish church is St. John's Church, Wroxall.

Bus services operated by Southern Vectis link the village with the towns of Newport, Ryde, Sandown, Shanklin and Ventnor, as well as intermediate villages.

References

Villages on the Isle of Wight
Civil parishes in the Isle of Wight